William Grayson Carter (died July 11, 1849) was an American politician from Kentucky. William was the son of John Carter (from Loudoun County, Virginia) and Hebe (Williams) Carter, and a grandson of Colonel William Grayson. He was a Kentucky state senator from 1834 to 1838. Carter County, Kentucky is named for him.

References

Year of birth missing
1849 deaths
Kentucky lawyers
Kentucky state senators
Deaths from cholera